Cara Horgan (born 5 October 1984) is an English actress who has appeared on stage, on television, and in films.

Career
Horgan has appeared in several television productions including Peep Show, Traitors, The Rotter's Club, Genius: Picasso and Jane Eyre.

She has appeared in films including The Boy in the Striped Pyjamas, The Wedding Video, Armando Iannucci's The Death of Stalin and Disobedience alongside Rachel McAdams and Rachel Weisz.

She appeared in music videos for Years & Years' single "Desire" and the Chemical Brothers' song "I'll See You There".

In 2008, Horgan appeared in Hedda, a modern updated version of Hedda Gabler, directed by Carrie Cracknell in which she played the lead character to favourable reviews; reviewer Charles Spencer in The Daily Telegraph wrote that she was "especially fine as a glamorous, bob-haired Hedda, ... using sex... like a shrimping net".

In 2009 she appeared in a revival of Ferdinand Bruckner's Krankheit der Jugend ("Pains of Youth"), directed by Katie Mitchell, at the National Theatre. In 2010, she appeared in Caryl Churchill's Far Away at Bristol Old Vic, directed by Simon Godwin.

In 2011, she performed in The School for Scandal directed by Deborah Warner and written by Richard Brinsley Sheridan.

From 2013 to 2015 she joined Sean Holmes ten-member Secret Theatre company at the Lyric Hammersmith, which experimented with improvisational techniques towards drama. For some performances, a cast member's name was chosen from a hat by an audience member to be the show's protagonist; then, he or she would be "given a series of increasingly impossible acts to accomplish" which could involve such activities as complex dance routines, wrestling, singing and improvisation, according to one account. She performed with the ensemble for two years to positive reviews. In an extended interview in Exeunt Magazine, she described her work at Secret Theatre as giving her "freedom to play".

In 2015, she appeared in The Mother at the Ustinov Studio in Bath. In 2017 she appeared in Cellmates at The Hampstead Theatre directed by Edward Hall. Paul Taylor in The Independent wrote "Cara Horgan is delectable in a double as the Russian maid who duets with Bourke in his hammy renditions of “Danny Boy” for his captors and as the wife in a CND couple who have an inconvenient marital meltdown while helping Blake on his first night outside"

Filmography

Film

Television

Theatre

References

External links

English film actresses
English television actresses
English stage actresses
English people of Irish descent
Alumni of the Drama Centre London
Actresses from London
Place of birth missing (living people)
Living people
21st-century English actresses
People educated at Bishop Luffa School
1984 births